Léon-Paul Ménard (4 February 1946 – 11 October 1993) was a French racing cyclist. He rode in the 1972 Tour de France.

References

1946 births
1993 deaths
French male cyclists
Place of birth missing